Dániel Pauman (born 13 August 1986) is a Hungarian canoer. He won a silver medal at the 2012 Summer Olympics in the K-4 1000 m event (with Zoltán Kammerer, Dávid Tóth and Tamás Kulifai). In June 2015, he competed in the inaugural European Games, for Hungary in canoe sprint, more specifically, men's K-4 1000m, again with Zoltan Kammerer, Dávid Tóth, and Tamás Kulifai. They earned a gold medal.

Awards and honours

Orders and special awards
   Order of Merit of Hungary – Knight's Cross (2012)

References

1986 births
Hungarian male canoeists
Living people
Canoeists at the 2012 Summer Olympics
Olympic canoeists of Hungary
Olympic silver medalists for Hungary
Olympic medalists in canoeing
Medalists at the 2012 Summer Olympics
People from Vác
European Games medalists in canoeing
European Games gold medalists for Hungary
Canoeists at the 2015 European Games
Sportspeople from Pest County
21st-century Hungarian people